Osterhout Mountain is a summit located in Wyoming County, Pennsylvania. Osterhout is located on the east bank of the Susquehanna River opposite its sister peak Miller Mountain. The mountain has communication towers on its summit and rises over the town of Tunkhannock Pennsylvania.

References

 

Mountains of Pennsylvania
Landforms of Wyoming County, Pennsylvania